Incarnate is a 2016 American supernatural horror film directed by Brad Peyton and written by Ronnie Christensen. It stars Aaron Eckhart, Carice van Houten,  Catalina Sandino Moreno, David Mazouz,  Keir O'Donnell, Matt Nable, and John Pirruccello.

The film was released on December 2, 2016, by Blumhouse Tilt and High Top Releasing.

Plot
An 11-year-old boy named Cameron Sparrow is attacked by a hooded stranger who tries to kill him. However, Cameron kills her instead and looks at the camera with red eyes, revealing that he is actually possessed by a demon named "Maggie".

Meanwhile, Dr. Seth Ember approaches a man named Henry in a club and makes him realize he is dreaming. Ember reveals that the woman Henry has been with is a demon who has possessed his body. The two escape and return to reality, and Henry is freed from the demon. In the waking world, Ember actually uses a wheelchair. Ember's assistant Oliver warns that the demons have started to adapt to Ember's efforts and that soon he may not be able to escape back to reality.

Ember is approached by Camilla, a representative from the Vatican, who asks him to exorcise Cameron. Ember refuses, stating that his methods are not "exorcisms," but Camilla reveals that she believes the demon is one Ember knows. Ember visits a priest named Felix to question whether the demon could indeed be Maggie, which Felix affirms. Felix offers him a vial of blood from a possessed man which, when injected, would allow Ember about ten seconds of lucidity - just enough time to commit suicide, but he refuses.

Ember meets the boy's mother Lindsay and explains that he does not exorcise demons but evicts them by entering their host's subconscious to make them realize they are dreaming. Demons do not have the power to truly control those they possess; instead, they lull their hosts into comforting dreams so they will be unaware while the demon uses their body. He visits the possessed Cameron and the demon recognizes him.

Ember, Oliver, and, the third member of their team, Riley prepare for the eviction. Riley explains that by entering a near-death state, Ember will be able to synchronize his brain frequencies to Cameron's and enter his subconscious. However in this state, Ember has only about eight minutes before his heart will give out. Ember enters Cameron's dream and sees him with his father, Dan, but has a seizure and has to be pulled out of the dream to be revived.

Ember demands that Dan be present to help evict the demon. Lindsay refuses, explaining that the couple separated after Dan broke Cameron's arm in a drunken rage, but she agrees when Ember insists that Cameron's father might be the only way to save Cameron. Dan's presence initially seems to help, but Maggie lashes out at him. Ember pleads with Maggie to release Dan since Ember is the one Maggie wants. The demon does so but Dan dies from his injuries. Lindsay, alarmed, demands to know Ember's history with the demon. Ember reveals he discovered that he had the power to perform astral projection and enter the dreams of possessed people, but hid his power to live a normal life. However, this made him a target for demons. One day, while driving with his wife and child, the three were hit by a car driven by a possessed driver. The attack left Ember's family dead and is the reason that he needs to use a wheelchair, and ever since, he's been hunting the demon "Maggie," whom he named after the woman it had possessed.

Ember visits Felix to acquire the blood vial but discovers that Felix has been possessed. Felix attacks Ember and commits suicide. Returning to Cameron's dream, Ember uses a ring Cameron had received as a gift from his real father to make the boy realize he is in an illusion. The pair flee from Maggie, and Ember helps Cameron escape. Ember and Cameron wake up, but Ember wakes up again in a hospital with his wife and son. He realizes he's now inside his own dream and begs Maggie to release Cameron and take him instead, to which the demon agrees. However, when Ember wakes up for real, Riley administers the blood and Ember uses his ten seconds to throw himself through the apartment window. As he dies, Riley warns everybody not to touch Ember's body.

Paramedics attempt to resuscitate Ember, joined by Camilla. They succeed in getting a heartbeat, allowing Maggie to possess Camilla, before Ember dies.

Cast
 Aaron Eckhart as Dr. Seth Ember
 Carice van Houten as Lindsay Sparrow
 David Mazouz as Cameron Sparrow
 Catalina Sandino Moreno as Camilla Marquez
 Keir O'Donnell as Oliver
  Emily Jackson as Riley
 Matthew Nable as Dan Sparrow
 Karolina Wydra as Anna Ember
 Emjay Anthony as Jake Ember
 John Purruccello as Henry
  Mark Steger as Maggie (Demon)
 Tomas Arana as Felix
 Mark Henry as Bouncer #2

Production
Brad Peyton was hired to direct & executive producer the film. Ronnie Christensen was hired to write the film. Blumhouse Productions and WWE Studios were hired to be the production companies.

Aaron Eckhart was cast in the film on September 17, 2013, followed by Mark Henry in November 25. Catalina Sandino Moreno, David Mazouz, George Anthony Anisimow and Karolina Wydra were cast later.

Music
Andrew Lockington composed the score. The soundtrack is now released at IM Global Music.

Reception

Box office
Incarnate was released in the United States on December 2, 2016 and was expected to gross $2–4 million from 1,737 theaters in its opening weekend. It ended up grossing $2.5 million, finishing 9th at the box office.

Critical response

Review aggregator website Rotten Tomatoes gives the film a score of 17% based on 35 reviews, with an average rating of 3.5/10. The critic consensus reads: "Incarnate can't be accused of lack of ideas -- if only any of them made sense or coalesced in any meaningful or scary way". On Metacritic, which assigns a normalized rating, the film has a score 30 out of 100, based on 9 critics, indicating "generally unfavorable reviews". Audiences polled by CinemaScore gave the film an average grade of "C−" on an A+ to F scale.

References

External links
 
 
 
 

2016 films
2016 horror thriller films
2016 horror films
American horror thriller films
American science fiction horror films
American science fiction thriller films
American supernatural horror films
American supernatural thriller films
2010s English-language films
Demons in film
Religious horror films
Films about exorcism
Films about paraplegics or quadriplegics
Blumhouse Productions films
WWE Studios films
Universal Pictures films
Films directed by Brad Peyton
Films produced by Jason Blum
Films scored by Andrew Lockington
2010s American films